Bahadurpur is a village and it is situated under Haridaskati Union of Manirampur Upazila of Jessore District in the division of Khulna, Bangladesh.

References

Villages in Khulna Division
Jashore District